Aleksandr Chistyakov may refer to:

 Aleksandr Chistyakov (actor) (1880–1942), Russian actor
 Aleksandr Chistyakov (footballer, born 1980), Russian footballer with FC Baltika Kaliningrad, FC Zvezda Irkutsk and FC Nizhny Novgorod, among others
 Aleksandr Chistyakov (footballer, born 1988), Russian footballer with FC SKA-Energiya Khabarovsk and FC Smena Komsomolsk-na-Amure